Thoughts That Float on a Different Blood is a cover album by Dustin Kensrue. It is the fifth album released by Kensrue, as well as his first live album. Vagrant Records released the album on March 18, 2016.  The album was recorded over two shows at the Constellation Room in Santa Ana, California in December 2015. A related EP, More Thoughts That Float on a Different Blood, was released on November 25, 2016, for Record Store Day. It consists of two additional cover songs.

Critical reception

Indicating in an eight out of ten review from Exclaim!, Adam Feibel states, "Thoughts That Float on a Different Blood is a hauntingly beautiful record that's much more than the sum of its parts." Craig Ismaili, signaling in an 8.8 review at AbsolutePunk, writes, "Dustin Kensrue certainly hits a home run here, releasing not just one of the best live albums of the past year, but one of the best albums of the year, period."

Track listing

Charts

References

2016 albums
Vagrant Records albums